László Kovács (24 April 1951 – 30 June 2017) was a Hungarian football goalkeeper who was in the squad for Hungary in the 1978 FIFA World Cup. He also played for Videoton FC.

References

External links
 FIFA profile

1951 births
2017 deaths
Hungarian footballers
Hungary international footballers
Association football goalkeepers
Fehérvár FC players
1978 FIFA World Cup players
People from Tatabánya
Hungarian football managers
Nemzeti Bajnokság I managers
FC Tatabánya managers
Sportspeople from Komárom-Esztergom County
20th-century Hungarian people